Åker/Strängnäs HC is a Swedish ice hockey club located in Strängnäs. The club will play the 2014–15 season in group East of Hockeyettan, the third tier of Swedish ice hockey. The club plays its home games in Åkers Ishall, which has a capacity of 1500 spectators. The club was founded in 2012 as a merger of Åkers IF's ice hockey section and Strängnäs HC.

References

External links
Official website
Club profile on Eliteprospects.com

Ice hockey teams in Södermanland County
Ice hockey teams in Sweden
Sports clubs in Sweden
2012 establishments in Sweden
Ice hockey clubs established in 2012